Forestdale or Forest Dale may refer to several places:

In Australia:
Forestdale, Queensland, a suburb of Logan City
Forrestdale, Western Australia, a suburb of Armadale

In England:
Forestdale, London
In the United States:
 Forestdale, Alabama
 Forestdale, Massachusetts
 Forestdale, Rhode Island
 Forest Dale, Vermont
 Forest Dale Historic District, in Salt Lake City, Utah
 Forestdale (agency) is a child care agency in New York City